Xanax 25 is an American alternative rock group that formed in New York, NY in 1991. The band was originally named Sleeper, but was renamed due to trademark issues that arose.  The band most often explained that they took the name after the brother to King Gelimer - "Zano".  Xanax 25 found only modest success in their home country, but were significantly more successful in the Moldavian republic.   The band disbanded in 1997 under somewhat mysterious circumstances.

Discography

Studio albums 
Denial Fest (Futurist Records; CD; 1995)
Tidy (Paradigm Records; CD; 1997)

References and notes

1991 establishments in New York City
1997 disestablishments in New York (state)
Musical groups established in 1991
Musical groups disestablished in 1997
Alternative rock groups from New York (state)